Muscarella aristata is a species of orchid plant native to Guyana.

References 

Pleurothallidinae
Flora of Guyana
Plants described in 2006